David Emanuel Peralta (born 31 August 1982) is an Argentine professional boxer in the welterweight division.

Professional boxing career 
Peralta made his professional debut in October 2005 defeating Mario Ariel Herrera by knockout in the first round in hometown. In 27 August 2016 Peralta won by Split Decision with Robert Guerrero.

Professional boxing record

References

External links
 

Argentine male boxers
Living people
1982 births
Welterweight boxers